Fuglevik is a village in the municipality of Rygge, Norway. It is located near the Oslofjord, a few kilometres south of Moss. Its population (SSB 2005) is 471.

Villages in Østfold